Berkey Valley is a valley,  long, on the eastern side of Price Terrace in the Cruzen Range of Victoria Land. The valley opens south to Barwick Valley. It was named by the Advisory Committee on Antarctic Names in 2005 after Frank T. Berkey, Center for Atmospheric and Space Sciences, Utah State University, Logan, UT; United States Antarctic Program principal investigator for observation of the ionosphere from Siple Station, 1982 and 1983, and from Amundsen–Scott South Pole Station, 1984–95.

References

Valleys of Victoria Land